The Stockholm University Student Union (SUS) is one of Sweden's largest student organisations with more than 22,000 members (as of November 2011). Stockholm University Student Union was founded in 1883.

External links 
 Official website of Stockholm University Student Union 
 Stockholm University Student Union 

Stockholm University
Students' unions in Sweden
1883 establishments in Sweden